This is a list of Brazilian television related events from 2013.

Events
26 March - Fernanda Keulla wins the thirteenth season of Big Brother Brasil.
20 June - 45-year-old coconut leaf musician Domingues da Palha wins the first season of Got Talent Brasil.
15 September - Actress Carol Castro and her partner Leandro Azevedo win the tenth season of Dança dos Famosos.
26 December - Sam Alves wins the second season of The Voice Brasil.

Debuts
2 April - Got Talent Brasil (2013–present)
3 April - Historietas Assombradas (para Crianças Malcriadas) (2013–present)

Television shows

1970s
Vila Sésamo (1972-1977, 2007–present)
Turma da Mônica (1976–present)

1990s
Malhação (1995–present)
Cocoricó (1996–present)

2000s
Big Brother Brasil (2002–present)
Dança dos Famosos (2005–present)
Peixonauta (2009–present)

2010s
Meu Amigãozão (2010–present)
Sítio do Picapau Amarelo (2012-2016)
The Voice Brasil (2012–present)

Ending this year

Births

Deaths

See also
2013 in Brazil
List of Brazilian films of 2013